In music from Western culture, a seventh is a musical interval encompassing seven staff positions (see Interval number for more details), and the major seventh is one of two commonly occurring sevenths. It is qualified as major because it is the larger of the two. The major seventh spans eleven semitones, its smaller counterpart being the minor seventh, spanning ten semitones. For example, the interval from C to B is a major seventh, as the note B lies eleven semitones above C, and there are seven staff positions from C to B. Diminished and augmented sevenths span the same number of staff positions, but consist of a different number of semitones (nine and twelve).

The easiest way to locate and identify the major seventh is from the octave rather than the unison, and it is suggested that one sings the octave first. For example, the most commonly cited example of a melody featuring a major seventh is the tonic-octave-major seventh of the opening to "(Somewhere) Over the Rainbow". "Not many songwriters begin a melody with a major seventh interval; perhaps that's why there are few memorable examples." However, two songs provide exceptions to this generalisation: Cole Porter's  "I love you" (1944) opens with a descending major seventh and Jesse Harris's "Don't Know Why",(made famous by Norah Jones in her 2002 debut album, Come Away with Me), starts with an ascending one.  In the refrain of "Bali Hai" in "South Pacific," the third tone ("Hai") is a major seventh to the first ("Ba-").

The major seventh occurs most commonly built on the root of major triads, resulting in the chord type also known as major seventh chord or major-major seventh chord: including I7 and IV7 in major. "Major seven chords add jazziness to a musical passage. Alone, a major seventh interval can sound ugly."

A major seventh in just intonation most often corresponds to a pitch ratio of 15:8; in 12-tone equal temperament, a major seventh is equal to eleven semitones, or 1100 cents, about 12 cents wider than the 15:8 major seventh. In 24-tone equal temperament a supermajor seventh, semiaugmented seventh or, semidiminished octave, 23 quarter-tones, is 1150 cents. The small major seventh is a ratio of 9:5, now identified as a just minor seventh. 35:18, or 1151.23 cents, is the ratio of the septimal semi-diminished octave. The 15:8 just major seventh occurs arises in the extended C major scale between C & B and F & E. 

The major seventh interval is considered one of the most dissonant intervals after its inversion the minor second. For this reason, its melodic use is infrequent in classical music. However, in the genial Gavotte from J.S. Bach’s Partita in E major for solo violin, a major seventh features both as a chord (bar 1) and as a melodic interval (bar 5): Another piece that makes more dramatic use of the major seventh is "The Hut on Fowl's Legs" from Mussorgsky's piano suite Pictures at an Exhibition (1874).  
Another is the closing duet from Verdi's Aida, "O terra addio". During the early 20th century, the major seventh was used increasingly both as a melodic and a harmonic interval, particularly by composers of the Second Viennese School.  Anton Webern's  Variations for Piano, Op. 27, opens with a major seventh and the interval recurs frequently throughout the piece.

Under equal temperament this interval is enharmonically equivalent to a diminished octave (which has a similar musical use to the augmented unison).

The major seventh chord is however very common in jazz, especially 'cool' jazz, and has a characteristically soft and sweet sound: think of the first chord in "The Girl from Ipanema". The major seventh chord consists of the first, third, fifth and seventh degrees (notes) of the major scale. In the key of C, it comprises the notes C E G and B.

See also
 List of meantone intervals
 Leading tone
 Major seventh chord
 Minor seventh
 Musical tuning

References

Major intervals
Sevenths (music)